"Millonario" (English: "Millionaire") is a song by American singer Romeo Santos with Dominican singer Elvis Martínez. It is the fifth single for Santos' fourth studio album Utopía (2019). The music video was released on July 19, 2019. It was filmed in New York. It was directed and produced by Fernando Lugo. The video starts with Santos sitting on the floor with a guitar while Martínez, who is sitting next to him, holding a sign that says "Quiero Ser Millonario" which in Spanish means "I want to be a millionaire". Then it shows them about to rob a bank until the people in the bank receive them with happieness. They would become rich with the loves of their lives. At the end it was all a dream and they would be awakened by a girl who saw them a sleep.

Charts

References 

2019 singles
2019 songs
Bachata songs
Romeo Santos songs
Spanish-language songs
Sony Music Latin singles
Songs written by Romeo Santos
Male vocal duets